Seal Rock is a small island in San Mateo County, California. It lies just off the county's Pacific coast, about halfway between Half Moon Bay and San Gregorio.

See also
List of islands of California

References

Islands of the San Francisco Bay Area
Islands of Northern California
Islands of San Mateo County, California
Geology of San Mateo County, California
Rock formations of California
Uninhabited islands of California
Pacific islands of California